The Live Earth concert in Antarctica was held at Rothera Research Station, one in a series of Live Earth concerts that took place on July 7, 2007, in all seven continents. The band Nunatak performed as the lone act. Nunatak's performances, though performed in front of only 17 people, were broadcast all over the world. It was the first rock concert ever performed in Antarctica.

Running order
Nunatak - "How Many People", "Would You Do It All Again" (AN 16:00)

Coverage

Television
In the U.S., NBC Universal's networks had exclusive television rights.

Satellite Radio
Live Earth was carried on all major satellite radio carriers in the US such as XM Satellite Radio and Sirius Satellite Radio.

Internet
All of Live Earth was broadcast online at liveearth.msn.com.

Recordings of Nunatak were made available on the British Antarctic Survey website and YouTube channel.

References

External links
Recordings of the Concert

Antarctica
2007 in Antarctica
Antarctic culture